Áine Furey is an Irish singer. She is the daughter of the uileann piper Finbar Furey and the sister of Martin Furey. She and Martin founded a band called Bohinta in 1992. They had a top-ten hit in France, from the album Excalibur, featuring Jean Reno as Merlin. Bohinta released two albums, Sessions and Belladonna. Furey has dueted with Martin and has accompanied others on various releases. She is a graduate of University College Cork.

Discography

Solo 

 Sweet Summer Rain – 1999

With Bohinta 

 Sessions
 Belladonna – 1996

Compilation albums 

 Celtic Woman
 Celtic Woman 2 – 2000

Finbar Furey with Martin en Áine 

 Chasing Moonlight

References

20th-century Irish women singers
21st-century Irish women singers
Living people
Year of birth missing (living people)